Shah-e-Alam's Tomb and Mosque, also known as Rasulabad Dargah or Shah Alam no Rozo, is a medieval mosque and tomb complex (Roza) in Shah Alam area of Ahmedabad, India.

History

Shah e Alam was the son of Syed Burhanuddin Qutub-ul-Alam and the great grandson of Syed Makhdoom Jahaniyan Jahangasht. Attracted to the court of Ahmed Shah I, his father settled at Vatva and died there in 1452. Shah e Alam succeeded his father and, till his death in 1475, was the guide of Mahmud Begada's youth, and afterwards one of the most revered of Muslim religious teachers of Ahmedabad.

Roza

A group of buildings, a tomb, a mosque, and an assembly hall, enclosed by a lofty and bastioned wall, was erected in the sacred to the memory of Shah e Alam. From the north the enclosure is entered through two handsome stone gateways. Within the second gate on the left is an assembly hall built by Sultan Muzaffar Shah III. (1561–1572), and partly destroyed by the British in 1779 to furnish materials for the siege of the city during the First Anglo-Maratha War. On the right are some other buildings of which the date has not been traced. In front of these buildings, to the right is a reservoir, and to the left of the reservoir in the centre of the enclosure, is Shah e Alam's tomb. This, the oldest of the buildings, is said to have been constructed soon after the saint's death in 1475 (880AH) and completed in 1483 (888AH) by Taj Khan Nariali, a nobleman of Mahmud Begada's court. It is of very pleasing design and has much of the special character of the buildings of that time. Early in the seventeenth century Asaf Khan, the brother of Nur Jahan, ornamented the dome with gold and precious stones. The tomb of Shah e Alam is situated roughly in the center of the east end of roza. The tomb is on a square plan with 12 pillars and a high dome in the centre of the roof, surrounded by double corridors with 24 small domes on top. It has arch-shaped entrance on all sides. The main entrance on the west having a small dome projects out from the wall. On each wall of the mausoleum, there is an entrance in the center. On either side of the entrance, there are three arch-shaped windows, over which an arch-shaped part covered by perforated stone windows. The floor of the tomb is inlaid with black and white marble, the doors are of open cut brass work, and the frame in which the doors aro set, as well as what shews between the door frame and the two stone pillars to the right and left, is of pure white marble beautifully carved and pierced. The tomb itself is completely enclosed by an inner wall of pierced stone. The outer wall in the north is of stone trellis work of the most varied design.

West of the tomb is the mosque, built by Muhammad Salah Badakhshi, with minarets at either end begun by Nizabat Khan and finished by Saif Khan in 1620. The mosque though pleasing in outline and with skilfully constructed domes has much of the ordinary Islamic architecture found in other parts of India, and scarcely belongs to the special Ahmedabad style. To the south of the mosque, a tomb on a plan similar to that of the chief mausoleum having twenty four small domes, is the burying of Shah e Alam's family including Saiyyd Makhdum Alam, the sixth grandson of Shah e Alam. Outside of the wall to the west is an argo reservoir built by the wife of Taj Khan Nariali. The minarets of the mosque were damaged by the 1819 Rann of Kutch earthquake but were restored in 1863.

Gallery

References 

 This article includes public domain text from 

Mosques in Ahmedabad
Religious buildings and structures completed in 1620
Monuments of National Importance in Gujarat